Bruno Malfacine (born 28 August 1986 in Duque de Caxias, Rio de Janeiro, Brazil) is a Brazilian Jiu Jitsu (BJJ) competitor. Malfacine, a winner of 10 World Championships, was inducted into the International Brazilian Jiu-Jitsu Federation Hall of Fame and is widely considered to be the best roosterweight of all time.

Biography
Bruno Malfacine was born on 28 August 1986 in Duque de Caxias, Rio de Janeiro, Brazil. He began training Brazilian Jiu-Jitsu in 1998 at the age of eleven under Carlos Santana. After Santana stopped coaching, Malfacine moved to the Gama Filho team and was awarded his black belt there. In 2008, he moved to São Paulo, to train with Fabio Gurgel, at the Alliance team, where he has achieved ten world titles.

In 2020, Malfacine opened up his own branch of Alliance Jiu-Jitsu in Orlando, Florida, where he currently teaches.

Bruno "Bad Boy" Malfacine has also competed in MMA and has a professional record of 3-0.

Mixed martial arts record 

|-
| Win
| align=center| 3–0
| Cristian Rodriguez 
| Submission 
| Brave CF 16: Abu Dhabi  
| 
| align=center|1
| align=center|4:20
| Abu Dhabi, United Arab Emirates 
|
|-
| Win
| align=center| 2–0
| Rafael Vinicius Pereira Costa
| Submission (armbar) 
| Brave CF 11: Mineiro vs. Santiago  
| 
| align=center|1
| align=center|3:18 
| Belo Horizonte, Brazil 
| 
|-
| Win
| align=center | 1–0
| Romario Garcia 
| Submission (armbar) 
| Shooto Brazil 74 
| 
| align=center | 1
| align=center | 1:34
| Rio de Janeiro, Brazil
|
|-

References

Brazilian practitioners of Brazilian jiu-jitsu
Living people
1986 births
People awarded a black belt in Brazilian jiu-jitsu
World Brazilian Jiu-Jitsu Championship medalists
IBJJF Hall of Fame inductees
Brazilian male mixed martial artists
Mixed martial artists utilizing Brazilian jiu-jitsu
Sportspeople from Rio de Janeiro (state)